Chelus orinocensis is a freshwater turtle found in South America, primarily in the Orinoco basin. It was split off from Chelus fimbriata in 2020.

Discovery via genomic analysis
A genomic analysis of the mata mata was reported in 2020, which showed a deep split between the populations in the Amazon and Orinoco basins. The authors proposed that the Orinoco population be assigned to a new species, Chelus orinocensis, with the Amazon population retaining the Chelus fimbriatus species designation.

Prior to its description as a separate species, observations of distinctive morphological differences had already been noted among specimens in the populations of the Amazon and Orinoco basins.

References

Chelus
Turtles of South America
Reptiles of French Guiana
Reptiles of Guyana
Reptiles of Suriname
Reptiles of Venezuela
Reptiles described in 2020
Extant Pliocene first appearances